Swiss-type cheeses, also known as Alpine cheeses, are a group of hard or semi-hard cheeses with a distinct character, whose origins lie in the Alps of Europe, although they are now eaten and imitated in most cheesemaking parts of the world. Their distinct character arose from the requirements of cheese made in the summer on high Alpine grasslands (alpage in French), and then transported with the cows down to the valleys in the winter, in the historic culture of Alpine transhumance. Traditionally the cheeses were made in large rounds or "wheels" with a hard rind, and were robust enough for both keeping and transporting. 

The best-known cheeses of the type, all made from cow's milk, include the Swiss Emmental, Gruyère and Appenzeller, as well as the French Beaufort and Comté (from the Jura Mountains, near the Alps). Both countries have many other traditional varieties, as do the Alpine regions of Austria (Alpkäse) and Italy (Asiago), though these have not achieved the same degree of intercontinental fame. Jarlsberg cheese originated in 19th-century Norway and is made using similar methods to Emmental. Maasdam cheese is a Dutch version, devised in the late 20th century. All of these are widely exported. In North America and some other areas outside Europe, Emmental is the best known, and is commonly called simply "Swiss cheese". However, in Switzerland itself more Gruyère is consumed, and in continental Europe Gruyère, a name with a considerably longer history, tends to be thought of as the archetypal Swiss cheese, with for example "Gruyère de Comté" being another name for Comté.  

Technically, Swiss-type cheeses are "cooked", meaning made using thermophilic lactic fermentation starters, incubating the curd with a period at a high temperature of 45°C or more. Since they are later pressed to expel excess moisture, the group are also described as "'cooked pressed cheeses'", fromages à pâte pressée cuite in French. Most varieties have few if any holes or "eyes", or holes that are much smaller than the large holes found in some Emmental or its imitations. The general eating characteristics of the cheeses are a firm but still elastic texture, flavour that is not sharp, acidic or salty, but rather nutty and buttery. When melted, which they often are in cooking, they are "gooey", and "slick, stretchy and runny".

A number of traditional types have legally controlled standards, for example the Appellation d'origine protégée in Switzerland, often covering the permitted breeds of cow, pastures, location and method of making, period of maturation, as well as details of their food chemistry. Most global modern production is industrial, with little control of these. This is usually made in rectangular blocks, and by wrapping in plastic no rind is allowed to form.  Historical production was all with "raw" milk, although the periods of high heat in making largely controlled unwelcome bacteria, but modern production may use thermized or pasteurized milk.

Cheesemaking

The cheesemaking process reflects the needs of Alpine transhumant makers. At the high summer slopes timber to "cook" the cheese was abundant, but salt had to be carried up, and was expensive, so little is used compared to many other cheese types. Cantal cheese in the Auvergne region of France, took a different approach, with much less heat, more salt, and more pressing. This became used for Cheddar cheese and other similar English varieties. 

Alpine cheeses are made to be aged, typically at least for a few months, but often much more. The cows reached the high slopes by about May, and remained until about October. Often they moved in stages as the snow retreated. Cheese was made during this period, and mostly stored before bringing down in autumn. Often the same cows and herders made a different kind of cheese from winter milk, and protected varieties may require summer (or winter) milk.

The Alpine process introduced three innovations. Firstly "the curd was cut into small particles to facilitate whey expulsion", now done by stirring the cheese with a "cheese harp", a set of metal wires (in French  or ). Other types of cheese cut the curd, but not into such small particles. Then the curds were "cooked at high temperatures" and pressed, both reducing the moisture content. The low acidity and salt helps the growth of particular bacteria, especially Propionibacterium freudenreichii subspecies shermanii. It is this that produces the gases, including carbon dioxide, which produce the holes or "eyes" in the cheese.  These were generally regarded as a fault if they were large, until 19th-century makers of Emmental began to encourage them, a brilliant stroke from the marketing point of view. On the other hand, Gruyère used to have larger holes than it does now.

Traditional Alpine cheeses are made in copper (or at least copper-lined) vats or "kettles", which are mandatory for many protected varieties, but industrial cheese is often made in stainless steel, especially in North America, where the use of copper is outlawed.  This has been suggested as one factor in the failure of North American cheeses to achieve the levels of flavour of the Alpine originals. In some places specific old copper vats can be "grandfathered" in.

History

According to the Historia Augusta, the Roman emperor Antoninus Pius fell ill and died in 161 after eating a large quantity of "Alpine cheese" ("cum Alpinum caseum in cena edisset avidius") at Lorium, near Rome. What the character of this cheese was is impossible to say, but it was evidently capable of being transported several hundred miles. 

There is evidence that in the Middle Ages Alpine cheesemaking was encouraged by local monasteries who owned large tracts of little-used Alpine land, and took cheese as tithes, in effect rent. One of the largest was the Abbey of Saint Gall in Switzerland, which owned much of the Appenzell region from the 10th century on. Muri Abbey was founded in 1027 with a large donation of Alpine wilderness, which it settled by offering a starter pack of equipment and animals to peasant families. Cheesemaking soon became an important part of the new local economy, with the tithe cheeses delivered to the abbey each Feast of Saint Andrew, on 30 November. Typically, about a dozen households combined their herds for the summer season, appointing a head cowman, and constructing high chalets to make cheese in.

The very hard Italian "grana" cheeses are regarded as a related group; the best known are Parmesan and Grana Padano. Although their origins lie in the flat and (originally) swampy Po Valley, they share the broad Alpine cheesemaking process, and began after local monasteries initiated drainage programmes from the 11th century onwards. These were Benedictine and Cistercian monasteries, both with sister-houses benefiting from Alpine cheesemaking. They seem to have borrowed their techniques from them, but produced very different cheeses, using much more salt, and less heating, which suited the local availability of materials.

The Black Death in the mid-14th century hit the Alps hard, and promoted an increase in grazing with cows rather than sheep or goats. The Protestant Reformation, which swept Switzerland if not other Alpine regions, removed the monastic landlords, and also some restrictions on eating cheese during Lent (although these already did not apply north of the Alps). By the 16th century Alpine cheeses were becoming significant export products, and were found to cope well with long intercontinental sea voyages.

Cheesemaking gallery
Some of the stages in the traditional cheesemaking process of French Beaufort cheese, which would be very similar in other "cooked pressed" Alpine cheeses.

Notes

References
Donnelley, Catherine W. (ed), Cheese and Microbes, 2014, ASM Press, 9781555818593, google books
Fox, P.H., ed., Fundamentals of Cheese Science, 2000, Springer Science & Business Media, 9780834212602, google books
Gruyère: "Gruyère" (in French) in the Kulinarisches Erbe der Schweiz
Kinstedt, Paul, Cheese and Culture: A History of Cheese and its Place in Western Civilization, 2012, Chelsea Green Publishing, 9781603584128, google books
Lortal, Sylvie, "Cheeses made with Thermophilic Lactic Starters", Chapter 16 in Handbook of Food and Beverage Fermentation Technology, 2004, CRC Press, 9780203913550, google books 
"Oxford": Donnelley, Catherine W. (ed), The Oxford Companion to Cheese, 2016, Oxford University Press, 9780199330881, google books 
Thorpe, Liz, The Book of Cheese: The Essential Guide to Discovering Cheeses You'll Love, 2017, Flatiron Books, 9781250063465, google books

Types of cheese

French cheeses
Austrian cheeses